David Ross Cuthbertson (May 5, 1868 – January 5, 1941) was a Michigan politician.

Political life
He was elected as the Mayor of City of Flint in 1923 for a single one-year term, defeating the incumbent mayor, William H. McKeighan.

Recall Election 1924 Results
A recall effort was mounted by people, including the Ku Klux Klan, who opposed Cuthbertson's appointment of a Catholic Police Chief, James P. Cole.  The 1924 election was successful in removing Cuthbertson.

Cuthbertson indicated that he would run in the replacement election.

References

Mayors of Flint, Michigan
Recalled American mayors
1868 births
1941 deaths
Michigan Democrats
20th-century American politicians